The Goya Award for Best European Film (Spanish: Premio Goya a la mejor película europea) is one of the Goya Awards, Spain's principal national film awards. The award was first presented at the seventh edition of the Goya Awards with the French film Indochine behind the first winner of the category.

Winners and nominees
The films are listed by the year they received the award or nomination. The winners are in a blue background and in bold. The countries are the ones listed at the official site of the Goya Awards.

1990s

2000s

2010s

2020s

Awards by nation
The following list excludes non-European countries that have received nominations for co-productions with European country. The list also excludes Spain.

References

External links
 Official site
 IMDb: Goya Awards

European film
Goya Award